Brian Schwake (born August 24, 2001) is an American professional soccer player who plays as a goalkeeper for Greenock Morton, on loan from Scottish Premiership side Livingston.

Club career

Livingston FC
Signed by Livingston after a freshman college season at DePaul Blue Demons in his native United States. Schwake's first months in Scotland were complicated by the restrictions of the COVID-19 pandemic. He spent a loan spell with Linlithgow Rose in 2020, featuring in their run in the 2020–21 Scottish Cup, and another loan with Edinburgh City in the 2021–22 season.

Edinburgh City (loan)
Schwake had a successful 2021-22 season on loan with Edinburgh City.  He appeared in 34 league games with 125 saves, second to Craig Gordon for number of saves in the SPFL. He was named to SPFL Team of the Week on August 17, 2021, and again on March 15, 2022. Schwake played a key role in Edinburgh City’s promotion to League 1, being named Man of the Match by BBC Alba for his saves in the second leg of the promotion play-off final. Schwake was named to SPFL League 2 Team of the Season for 2021–22.

Greenock Morton (loan)
On June 16, 2022, Livingston announced that Schwake had been loaned to Greenock Morton for the 2022–23 season. He was named to SPFL Team of the Round on 21 July 2022  and SPFL Team of the Week on 22 November 2022. Schwake is "higly accurate in possession, completing 73% of long passes."  He leads the league for most clean sheets and is top three for saves for the season to date. Livingston retained the option to recall Schwake in January 2023.

References

2001 births
Living people
American soccer players
Association football goalkeepers
Livingston F.C. players
Linlithgow Rose F.C. players
F.C. Edinburgh players
Scottish Professional Football League players
American expatriate soccer players
American expatriate sportspeople in Scotland
Expatriate footballers in Scotland
Soccer players from Illinois
People from Mount Prospect, Illinois
DePaul Blue Demons men's soccer players